The 2nd Psychological Operations Group is a psychological operations (PSYOP) unit of the United States Army Reserve.

Constituted 29 October 1965 in the Regular Army as the 2nd Psychological Operations Group. Activated 20 December 1965 at Fort Bragg, North Carolina. Inactivated 13 September 1972 at Fort Bragg, North Carolina. Redesignated 30 October 1975 as Headquarters and Headquarters Detachment, 2nd Psychological Operations Group; concurrently withdrawn from the Regular Army, allotted to the Army Reserve, and activated at Twinsburg, Ohio. Reorganized and redesignated 18 September 1990 as Headquarters and Headquarters Company, 2nd Psychological Operations Group.

External links
2nd Psychological Operations Group (Airborne) at globalsecurity.org

Psychological Operations 002